was a Japanese politician of the Liberal Democratic Party, a member of the House of Representatives in the Diet (national legislature).

Kagita was born in Nara, son of former House of Representative member Kagita Saburou Tadashi. Kagita graduated from Kokushikan University with a Bachelor's degree in Politics and Economics. He had served in the assembly of Nara Prefecture for three terms since 1995 and became the mayor of Nara in 2004. Resigning as mayor in 2005, he ran unsuccessfully for the mayor of Nara in the same year (defeated by current mayor Gen Nakagawa in the 2009 elections). He was elected to the House of Representatives for the first time in 2005 and resigned in 2009 to run as mayor of Nara.

References 

 

1957 births
2011 deaths
Koizumi Children
Mayors of places in Japan
Members of the House of Representatives (Japan)
Liberal Democratic Party (Japan) politicians
Politicians from Nara Prefecture
Kokushikan University alumni